Maritsa or Maritza, also known as Meriç and Evros, is a river that runs through the Balkans in Southeast Europe. It flows through Bulgaria in its upper and middle reaches, while its lower course forms much of the border between Greece and Turkey. It is the main river of the historical region of Thrace, most of which lies in its drainage basin.

It has its origin in the Rila Mountains in Western Bulgaria, its source being the Marichini Lakes. The Maritsa flows east-southeast between the Balkan and Rhodope Mountains, past Plovdiv and Dimitrovgrad in Bulgaria to Edirne in Turkey.  East of Svilengrad, Bulgaria, the river flows eastwards, forming the border between Bulgaria (on the north bank) and Greece (on the south bank), and then between Turkey and Greece. At Edirne, the river meets it two chief tributaries Tundzha and Arda, and flows through Turkish territory on both banks. It then turns towards the south and forms the border between Greece on the west bank and Turkey on the east bank all the way to the Aegean Sea, which it enters near Enez forming a river delta. The upper Maritsa valley is a principal east–west route in Bulgaria. The unnavigable river is used for power production and irrigation.

Names
Proto-Indo-European  and Ancient Greek  meant "wide". The Proto-Indo-European consonant cluster *-wr- shifted in Thracian to -br-, creating the Thracian name . Rather than an origin as 'wide river', an alternative hypothesis is that is borrowed from Thracian  meaning 'splasher'.

History

In 1371, the river was the site of the Battle of Maritsa, also known as the battle of Chernomen, an Ottoman victory over the Serbian rulers Vukašin Mrnjavčević and Jovan Uglješa, who died in the battle.

The Maritsa river as a natural barrier on the border between Turkey and Greece has become a major route for migrants from a variety of countries attempting to enter the EU irregularly.  Between 2000 and 2019, 398 bodies were found on the Greek side of the Maritsa river. Up until that time, drowning in the Maritsa was the leading cause of death among migrants trying to enter Greece. In February 2020, Turkey unilaterally opened its borders to Greece to allow refugees and migrants seeking refuge to reach the European Union, leading to the 2020 Greek–Turkish border crisis.

Tributaries

Starting from the river's source, significant tributaries of Maritsa include:
Left tributaries:
Topolnitsa (flows into Maritsa near Pazardzhik)
Luda Yana (near Ognyanovo)
Stryama (near Sadovo)
Sazliyka (near Simeonovgrad)
Tundzha/Tunca (in Edirne)
Ergene (near İpsala)
Right tributaries:
Chepinska reka (near Septemvri)
Vacha (near Stamboliyski)
Chepelarska reka (near Sadovo)
Harmanliyska reka (near Harmanli)
Arda/Ardas (near Edirne)
Erythropotamos/Luda reka (near Didymoteicho)

Floods

The lower course of the river Maritsa, where it forms the border of Greece and Turkey, is very vulnerable to flooding. For about 4 months every year, the low lands around the river are flooded. This causes significant economic damage (loss of agricultural production and damage to infrastructure), which is estimated at several hundreds million Euro.

Recent large floods took place in 2006, 2007, 2014, with the largest flood taking place in 2021. Several causes have been proposed: more rainfall due to climate change, deforestation in the Bulgarian part of the catchment area, increased land use in the flood plains and difficult communication between the three countries.

Trivia
Maritsa Peak on Livingston Island in the South Shetland Islands, Antarctica is named after Maritsa River.

La Maritza is also a 1968 song written by Jean Renard and Pierre Delanoë and interpreted by Sylvie Vartan.

Hebrus Valles on Mars is named after this river.

The Bulgarian Maritsa motorway, which roughly follows the course of the river from Chirpan  (where it branches out of the Trakia motorway) to the Turkish border at Kapitan Andreevo, is also named in honour of the river.

Gallery

Notes

References
 

Rivers of Bulgaria
Rivers of Greece
Rivers of Turkey
International rivers of Europe
 
Bulgaria–Greece border
Greece–Turkey border
Landforms of Edirne Province
Landforms of Pazardzhik Province
Landforms of Plovdiv Province
Landforms of Haskovo Province
Landforms of Sofia Province
Landforms of Evros (regional unit)
Rivers of Eastern Macedonia and Thrace
Border rivers